Georgios Grigoriou (born 1871, date of death unknown) was a Greek athlete. He was born in Sozopol. He competed at the 1896 Summer Olympics in Athens. Grigoriou was one of 17 athletes to start the marathon race.  He was one of the seven runners that dropped out of the race.

References

External links

1871 births
Year of death missing
Greek male marathon runners
Greek male long-distance runners
Olympic athletes of Greece
Athletes (track and field) at the 1896 Summer Olympics
19th-century sportsmen
Date of birth missing
Place of death missing
People from Sozopol